Elephantopus mollis, common names  tobacco weed, and soft elephantsfoot, is a tropical species of flowering plant in the sunflower family.

Elephantopus mollis is native to South America as far south as Jujuy Province in Argentina, as well as the West Indies, Central America, and Mexico as far north as Tamaulipas and Nuevo León. It is also naturalized in Australia, south-eastern Asia, some Pacific Islands, and tropical Africa. The species is considered a noxious weed some places.

Elephantopus mollis is a coarse perennial herb up to 20 cm (8 inches) tall. Leaves are dark green on the upper side, lighter green on the lower surface, oblanceolate to elliptical, up to 22 cm (9 inches) long. The plant produces arrays of small flower heads, each with only 4 white or pink florets.

References

Vernonieae
Plants described in 1818
Flora of Mexico
Flora of Central America
Flora of South America
Flora of the Caribbean
Flora without expected TNC conservation status